The Modena Classic Open was an annual professional golf tournament held at Modena G&CC, near Modena, Italy.

The tournament became part of the second tier Challenge Tour schedule in 1996, where it remained until 1998.

Winners

References

External links
Official coverage on the Challenge Tour's official site

Former Challenge Tour events
Golf tournaments in Italy